Benjamin Wallquist (born 24 January 2000) is an Austrian footballer who plays as a defender in FC Juniors OÖ.

Career
Wallquist joined Red Bull Salzburg from Admira Wacker in 2014. On 21 April 2017, Wallquist made his league debut for Liefering in a 3-0 loss to LASK Linz. On 2 May 2017, after two first team appearances for Liefering, Wallquist joined German side Hoffenheim. He made one appearance for the second team of Hoffenheim in the next two seasons.

On 23 July 2019 he joined German fourth-tier club Rot-Weiss Essen. After terminating his deal with Rot-Weiss in January 2020, Wallquist went on a trial at TSV Hartberg, but ended up signing with FC Juniors OÖ on 28 January 2020.

References

Living people
2000 births
Austrian footballers
Austrian expatriate footballers
Association football defenders
FC Admira Wacker Mödling players
FC Red Bull Salzburg players
FC Liefering players
TSG 1899 Hoffenheim II players
Rot-Weiss Essen players
FC Juniors OÖ players
2. Liga (Austria) players
Austrian expatriate sportspeople in Germany
Expatriate footballers in Germany